Valery Ivanovich Shumakov (9 November 1931 – 27 January 2008) was a Russian surgeon and transplantologist, famous for being the founding father of organ transplants in Russia and was a pioneer of artificial organ surgery.

Career
Shumakov began his medical career by researching blood flow during congenital heart disorder operations.

He was the founding father of organ transplants in Russia, creating the Medical Research Institute of Transplantation and Artificial Organs, which he headed for more than 30 years (since 1974). He was the first doctor in Russia to successfully transplant a liver, a heart and a thyroid. Valery Shumakov has written more than 20 books and 450 scientific publications.

Shumakov was recognized by both the Soviet and Russian governments for his achievements in medicine. Member of the Russian Academy of Sciences and the Russian Academy of Medical Sciences, he also won the international gold medal Outstanding World Surgeon.

In 2002, Valery Shumakov received the Russian state's highest distinction, the Order of Saint Andrew. Speaking in the ceremony, Vladimir Putin described Shumakov as "a surprising personality, a scientist whose name known to the world and an uncommonly talented surgeon."

Honours and awards
 Hero of Socialist Labour (26 December 1990) - for outstanding contributions to the development of Soviet transplantation and its application in practice, fruitful scientific and social activities
 Order of Saint Andrew (3 November 2001) - for outstanding achievement in the field of health and medical science
 Order of Merit for the Fatherland;
2nd class (12 April 1999) - for outstanding contribution to the national transplant establishment and implementation of artificial organs in clinical practice, fruitful scientific and social activity'
3rd class (20 March 1995) - for outstanding achievements in health and medical science, advances in transplantation and artificial organs
 Order of Lenin (1990)
 Medal "In Commemoration of the 850th Anniversary of Moscow" (1997)
 Honoured Inventor of the RSFSR (1978)
 USSR State Prize (1971)
 Laureate of the Russian Federation in Science and Technology (1997)
 Honoured Citizen of Moscow (1997)

See also
 Cardiothoracic Surgery
 Artificial heart

References

External links
 Biography
 Biography
 Biography
 Biography

1931 births
2008 deaths
Physicians from Moscow
Russian transplant surgeons
Russian cardiac surgeons
Academic staff of the Moscow Institute of Physics and Technology
Full Members of the Russian Academy of Sciences
Academicians of the USSR Academy of Medical Sciences
Academicians of the Russian Academy of Medical Sciences
Recipients of the USSR State Prize
Heroes of Socialist Labour
Recipients of the Order of Lenin
Recipients of the Order "For Merit to the Fatherland", 2nd class
Soviet surgeons
I.M. Sechenov First Moscow State Medical University alumni